Martial Donnet 

(born 22 September 1956) is a Swiss former alpine skier.

See also
Glossary of skiing and snowboarding terms
History of skiing
Swiss Alps

References

External links
 fis-ski.com

1956 births
Living people
Swiss male alpine skiers
Place of birth missing (living people)